The Japanese anime television series Angel Beats! is based on an original concept by Jun Maeda with original character design by Na-Ga; both Maeda and Na-Ga are from the visual novel brand Key known for producing such titles as Kanon, Air, and Clannad. It is directed by Seiji Kishi and produced by the animation studio P.A. Works and production company Aniplex. Chief animator Katsuzō Hirata is also the character designer and the screenplay was written by Maeda. The music, composed by Maeda and the group Anant-Garde Eyes, is produced by Aniplex with Satoki Iida as the sound director. The plot takes place in the afterlife and follows the main protagonist Yuzuru Otonashi, a boy who lost his memories of his life after dying. He is enrolled into the afterlife school and meets a girl named Yuri Nakamura who invites him to join the —an organization she leads which fights against God. The SSS fight against the student council president Angel, a girl with supernatural powers.

The series aired 13 episodes between April 3 and June 26, 2010 on the CBC television network in Japan. It aired at later dates than CBC on BS11, MBS, RKB, TBS, and TUT. The first episode was previewed on March 22, 2010 to a selected number of people who participated in a lottery held earlier that month. The series was released on seven BD/DVD compilation volumes between June 23 and December 22, 2010 in limited and regular editions. Three drama CDs, written by Maeda and performed by the anime's cast, were released with the first, fourth and sixth limited edition BD/DVD volumes. The seventh BD/DVD volume featured an original video animation (OVA) episode, as well as a bonus short which serves as another epilogue to the series. A second OVA episode was included with a Blu-ray Disc box set, released in Japan on June 24, 2015. Sentai Filmworks licensed the anime, and along with distributor Section23 Films, released the series on BD/DVD on July 26, 2011. Siren Visual licensed the anime for Australia and New Zealand. The series has also been licensed in the United Kingdom by Manga Entertainment and released the series on BD/DVD on June 25, 2012.

The series makes use of two pieces of theme music: one opening theme and one ending theme. The opening theme is "My Soul, Your Beats!" by Lia, and a remixed version sung by LiSA was used for episode four. The ending theme is "Brave Song" by Aoi Tada. Several insert theme songs by the in-story band Girls Dead Monster are also used, featuring songs sung by Marina and LiSA. "Ichiban no Takaramono" is also used in episode 13 sung by Karuta.


Episode list

References

External links
Angel Beats! official website 

Angel Beats!
Key (company)
Lists of anime episodes